The Academy Museum of Motion Pictures is a museum in Los Angeles, California constructed by the Academy of Motion Picture Arts and Sciences (AMPAS), which is devoted to the history, science, and cultural impact of the film industry. It is the first large-scale museum of its kind in the United States. The museum is located in the historic May Company Building on the intersection Wilshire Boulevard and Fairfax Avenue, part of Museum Row on the Miracle Mile.

Originally expected to open in 2020, its completion and opening was delayed due to the COVID-19 pandemic. The museum eventually opened to selected celebrity guests on September 25, 2021, and to the general public on September 30.

On Thursday, July 14, the museum voluntarily recognized Academy Museum Workers United as the bargaining representative for 160 of its employees.

Design 
The design of the museum was overseen by Italian architect Renzo Piano. The exterior of the May Company building, dedicated as the Saban Building following a $50 million donation from Cheryl and Haim Saban, was refurbished with new limestone, as well as new gold leaf tiles for its corner "cylinder".

The Saban Building's lobby includes two exhibit areas, the Spielberg Family Gallery and the Marilyn and Jeffrey Katzenberg Gallery. The Shirley Temple Education Studio will be devoted to workshops on filmmaking, and include a collection of items and memorabilia from Shirley Temple's career.

A spherical structure was built as an extension of the main Saban Building, connected via skyways, which features the glass-domed Dolby Family Terrace. The museum features two theater halls that will be used for film screenings, programming, and other special events; the 1,000-seat David Geffen Theater in the Sphere, and the smaller, 288-seat Ted Mann Theater in the lower level of the Saban Building.

Collections 
The Academy holds more than 13 million objects including costumes, costume sketches, film reels, posters, props, and screenplays dating back to 1927. In May 2020, the museum purchased the May Queen dress worn by Florence Pugh in Midsommar (2019) for $65,000, as part of a charity auction held by A24 to benefit COVID-19 relief efforts.

Some key objects in the Museum's collection include:
Dorothy's ruby slippers from The Wizard of Oz (1939)
Shirley Temple's tap shoes from The Little Colonel (1935)
Typewriter used to write the screenplay for Alfred Hitchcock's Psycho (1960)
The only surviving shark mold from Jaws (1975)
Tablets from The Ten Commandments (1956)
The Aries 1B spaceship model and a space suit worn by Keir Dullea from 2001: A Space Odyssey (1968)
The costume of the amphibian man from the Guillermo del Toro’s The Shape of Water (2017)
 From the 1982 film E.T. the Extra-Terrestrial an E.T. Prop is displayed. 
A cape used by Bela Lugosi in Dracula (1931)
The yellow dress worn by Emma Stone in La La Land (2016)
Pillars named for historical significance in motion picture history including Rita Moreno, Cher, Barbra Streisand, and Hattie McDaniel.

Exhibitions
The second and third floors of the museum will feature the opening exhibition "Stories of Cinema". The inaugural temporary collection of the Marilyn and Jeffrey Katzenberg Gallery is devoted to Japanese animator Hayao Miyazaki. The exhibition opened on September 30, 2021, and was on view until June 5, 2022. This was the first time Miyazaki’s work was featured in a major retrospective in the United States. The collection also displayed pieces on public view for the first time outside of Japan. The 11,000-square-foot exhibition features more than 300 objects, including original image boards, character designs, storyboards, layouts, backgrounds, posters, and cels. The exhibition’s curators, Jessica Niebel and assistant curator J. Raúl Guzmán worked with Studio Ghibli and the Ghibli Museum in Japan to gather all the materials. There are also interactive installations displayed throughout the exhibit, the “Mother Tree,” Skyview, and Magical Forest, to name a few, each inspired by a different Miyazaki Film.

Following that will be an exploration of the history of black cinema through 1971.

Galleries in the museum will be dedicated to a variety of topics. Inaugural galleries will cover:

Pedro Almodóvar
Citizen Kane (1941)
Climate change
Black Lives Matter
Blackface, redface, and yellowface
Labor relations
Bruce Lee
Spike Lee
#MeToo
Oscar Micheaux
Racism and sexism in animation
Real Women Have Curves (2002)
Thelma Schoonmaker

An area featuring Oscar statuettes will be dedicated to historic Oscar winners, including Ang Lee, Barry Jenkins, Sidney Poitier, and Buffy Sainte-Marie.

A "largely uncritical" exhibit on the history of the film industry, slated to be called "Where Dreams Are Made: A Journey Inside the Movies", was scrapped by Kramer to be replaced with a more "complex, complete" exhibit.

Board of trustees
The museum's board of trustees includes:
Eric Esrailian
Laura Dern
Whoopi Goldberg
Tom Hanks
Ryan Murphy
Ted Sarandos
Diane von Fürstenberg

Film premieres
The museum will also be a site for Los Angeles premieres of new films. Films that have held premieres here include:
Last Night in Soho (2021)
Belfast (2021)
House of Gucci (2021)
Nightmare Alley (2021)
Being the Ricardos (2021)
Ambulance (2022)
Babylon (2022)

Controversy 
The museum has attracted criticism for a perceived lack of focus on Jewish industry pioneers such as Carl Laemmle and Jack Warner first reported by Sharon Rosen Leib in The Forward. ADL CEO Jonathan Greenblatt expressed his disappointment, stating "I would’ve hoped that any honest historical assessment of the motion picture industry — its origins, its development, its growth — would include the role that Jews played in building the industry from the ground up". The Forward, Bill Maher and Bari Weiss also raised the issue.

In January 2022, The Academy Museum announced plans to create a permanent exhibit showcasing Hollywood's Jewish pioneers scheduled to open May 2023.

See also
List of museums in Los Angeles

References

External links

 
Museum
Cinema museums in California
Museums in Los Angeles
History museums in Hollywood, Los Angeles
Cinema of Southern California
Renzo Piano buildings
Mid-Wilshire, Los Angeles
Wilshire, Los Angeles
Museums established in 2021
2021 establishments in California